Oberea humilis is a species of beetle in the family Cerambycidae. It was described by Léon Fairmaire in 1894.

References

humilis
Beetles described in 1894